The 2023 season will be the Atlanta Falcons' upcoming 58th in the National Football League, their seventh playing their home games at Mercedes-Benz Stadium and their third under the head coach/general manager tandem of Arthur Smith and Terry Fontenot. The Falcons will attempt to improve upon their 7-10 record from the previous year and return to the playoffs for the first time since 2017.

Draft

Staff

Current roster

Preseason
The Falcons' preseason opponents and schedule will be announced in the spring.

Regular season

2023 opponents
Listed below are the Falcons' opponents for 2023. Exact dates and times will be announced in the spring.

References

External links
 

Atlanta
Atlanta Falcons seasons
Atlanta Falcons